Killer Elite is a 1985 album released by the British heavy metal band Avenger. It was released by Neat Records.

Track listing

Personnel
Avenger
Ian Davison Swift - lead vocals
Greg Reiter - guitars
Mick Moore - bass guitar
Gary Young - drums

Production
Keith Nichol - producer, engineer

References

1985 albums
New Wave of British Heavy Metal albums